Zukisa Laura Lumka Tshiqi (born 11 January 1961) is a judge of the Constitutional Court of South Africa and formerly served on the country's Supreme Court of Appeal and as an acting judge on the Constitutional Court.

Early life

Tshiqi was born in the village of Cefane, part of the town of Ngcobo, Cape Province in 1961. She earned a B Proc from the University of the Witwatersrand and an advanced diploma in labour law from Rand Afrikaans University. Thereafter she practiced as an attorney.

Judicial career

Tshiqi was made an acting judge of South Gauteng High Court in 2003, and was permanently appointed in 2005. She was promoted to the Supreme Court of Appeal in 2009, and served on the Constitutional Court in 2014-15 as an acting judge. She applied for a permanent position on the Constitutional Court in 2015 but was generally regarded by commentators as a poor candidate, with the position going to Nonkosi Mhlantla. In 2019, Tshiqi was appointed to the Constitutional Court.

References

1961 births
Living people
Judges of the Constitutional Court of South Africa
South African women judges
University of the Witwatersrand alumni
South African judges